The 2014 MLS Expansion Draft was a draft for the Major League Soccer expansion teams New York City FC and Orlando City SC that took place between November 19 and December 10, 2014. The first two rounds of the draft (which were known as the 2014 MLS Dispersal Draft) were held to distribute players who were formerly contracted with Chivas USA, which was dissolved by the league in October 2014 shortly after the end of the 2014 MLS season.

As determined by a "Priority Draft" that was conducted on September 24, 2014, Orlando City SC selected first in the expansion draft, which was held via conference call at 2:00 pm EST (UTC-5) on December 10, 2014. The order of the dispersal draft was conducted through a random weighted draw that took place on November 14, 2014. The league confirmed on November 7, 2014 that Chivas USA striker Erick Torres would not be made available in the dispersal draft.

Draft format
 Existing teams were allowed to protect 11 players from their rosters. Generation Adidas players and Homegrown Players on supplemental rosters were automatically protected, though players who graduated from the program to the senior roster at the end of the 2014 season were not.
 Once a player was claimed from a club’s non-protected roster, that club was allowed to move a player from its non-protected roster to its protected roster.
 Once two players were claimed from a team’s non-protected roster, that team was eliminated from the expansion draft and not allowed to lose any further players.

Player selection

Round 1

Round 2

Expansion draft

Five teams lost two players in the draft: Colorado Rapids, Columbus Crew, D.C. United, New England Revolution, and Real Salt Lake. Three teams did not lose any players: Chicago Fire, LA Galaxy, and New York Red Bulls. The remaining teams lost one player each.

Unselected players
The following players were on the final roster of Chivas USA but were not selected in the first two rounds of the draft. This list does not include players who were on loan to Chivas USA.

Other Chivas USA assets
Two draft picks held by Chivas USA at the time of its contraction were deleted from the 2015 MLS SuperDraft and not made available for selection in the dispersal draft. These two deleted draft picks were Chivas USA's natural third-round and fourth-round selections. Had Chivas USA not been contracted these would have been overall selections #48 and #69 in the 2015 SuperDraft.

Prior to being contracted, Chivas USA had already traded away its natural 2015 SuperDraft Round 1 (pick #6 to Toronto FC) and Round 2 (pick #27 to Seattle Sounders FC) selections. It had also acquired a Round 4 pick from D.C. United but Chivas had later traded this pick to Colorado Rapids. These picks, along with a Round 2 selection in the 2016 MLS SuperDraft traded to Columbus Crew SC, remained with the clubs which acquired them.

As of August 2015, the league had not announced the fate of the extra permanent international roster slot acquired by Chivas USA from Real Salt Lake in November 2004.

References

Major League Soccer Expansion Draft
MLS Expansion Draft
MLS Expansion Draft